Unionville is an unincorporated community on the line between northwestern Harpersfield Township in Ashtabula County and eastern Madison Township in Lake County in the U.S. state of Ohio. It has a post office with the ZIP code 44088. It lies along State Route 84.

The community's location where two counties meet caused the name "Union" to be selected.  Unionville is the site of the land office of the Connecticut Western Reserve; it is listed on the National Register of Historic Places.

Notable person
Edwin Wheeler, Wisconsin jurist and legislator

References

Unincorporated communities in Ashtabula County, Ohio
Unincorporated communities in Lake County, Ohio
Unincorporated communities in Ohio